Eric Shelton may refer to:

 Eric Shelton (American football) (born 1983), American football running back
 Eric Shelton (fighter) (born 1991), American mixed martial artist